L'Asino (The Donkey) was an Italian magazine of political satire founded in Rome on November 27, 1892, by Guido Podrecca (1865–1923) and Gabriele Galantara (1867–1937), a former mathematics student, designer and cartoonist, both with a socialist background. The two took the pseudonyms "Goliardo" (Podrecca) and "Ratalanga" (Galantara), and with these nicknames signed the outputs of the weekly. The magazine's title was from a saying of Francesco Domenico Guerrazzi that said that "the donkey is like the people: useful, patient and stubborn" (in Italian: "come il popolo è l'asino: utile, paziente e bastonato), which became the subtitle and the motto of the editors.

Early years
The magazine immediately focused its attention on the collapse of the Banca Romana in 1893 and Prime Minister Giovanni Giolitti, and in a short time reached a circulation of 22,000 copies. The success of the magazine led its two founders to embark on a daily publication at the beginning of 1895. However, this proved to be unsustainable and, in August 1895, the magazine resumed on a weekly basis. In 1897, Podrecca and Galantara were arrested for subversive propaganda and L'Asino had to suspend publication for a short period.

Anticlericalism
After 1901, the magazine began to criticize the Catholic Church and became the leading anticlerical journal. As a result, the magazine was banned from Vatican City. In 1904, L'Asino reached a circulation of 60,000, which rose to 100,000 before 1912. The magazine circulated widely among Italian immigrants in the United States. Due to its anticlerical and alleged pornographic content, the papal nuncio in Washington D.C. succeeded to get it banned from entry in 1908. However, the ban was circumvented by printing an American edition in New York City.

Rift between the founders
In 1911, the war in Libya caused a serious rift between Podrecca, who had been elected deputy for the Italian Socialist Party in 1909, and supported Leonida Bissolati, who was in favour of the war, while Galantara resolutely opposed in the name of anti-militarist and internationalist principles. L'Asino floundered, giving space to both positions, but the cartoons of Galantara against the war were more effective than the articles of Podrecca in favour of it.

Both founders sided with the interventionists during World War I, but the magazine lost its bite his cartoons with its nationalist stance.

Closed down

Publication was interrupted from 1918 to 1921, due to technical and economic difficulties, such as lack of paper. While Podrecca traveled to the United States in 1922 and shortly thereafter died of pneumonia in 1923 (Auburn, NY), Galantara, who had returned to his initial socialist principles, resumed the magazine in December 1921. The publication opposed the Fascist dictatorship of Benito Mussolini and was forced to suspend publication in the spring of 1925 due to a new law restricting press freedom and after a long series of threats, harassment and interventions of fascist gangs in the newsroom.

For the cover of the final issue of L'Asino, Galantara made a caricature of Mussolini, entitled Lui (Him) that would become a role model of foreign designers worldwide. Mussolini appeared with a huge bald head and surmounted by a crown on which is written "trouble to anyone who touches me", a huge mouth and two big eyes wide and crossed by a light of madness.

After the closure of L'Asino, Galantara continued to create cartoons for the antifascist satirical newspaper Il Becco Giallo, but in December 1926 he was arrested and sentenced to five years of confinement. In 1927, the sentence was commuted to probation, but he remained barred from any journalistic activity.

References

Sources
 Danky, James Philip & Wiegand Wayne A. (eds.) (1998).  Print Culture in a Diverse America, Champaign (IL): University of Illinois Press, 
 Goldstein, Robert Justin (ed.) (2000). The War for the Public Mind: Political Censorship in Nineteenth-century Europe, Westport (CT): Praeger Publishers, 
 Lernout, Geert (2010). Help My Unbelief: James Joyce and Religion, London/New York: Continuum, 
Mascha, Efharis. “Political Satire and Hegemony: A Case of ‘passive Revolution’ During Mussolini’s Ascendance to Power 1919–1925.” Humor (Berlin, Germany) 21, no. 1 (2008): 69–98.
 Tholas-Disset, Clémentine & Ritzenhoff, Karen A. (eds.) (2015). Humor, Entertainment, and Popular Culture During World War I, New York: Palgrave Macmillan,

External links
  L'Asino e il popolo: utile, paziente e bastonato, Premio Satira Politica (1982)
  Archivio immagini, Centro Studi Gabriele Galantara

1892 establishments in Italy
1925 disestablishments in Italy
Defunct political magazines published in Italy
Italian-language magazines
Magazines established in 1892
Magazines disestablished in 1925
Magazines published in Rome
Satirical magazines published in Italy
Weekly magazines published in Italy